Attucks may refer to:

People:
 Crispus Attucks, early victim of the American Revolution

Institutions:
 Attucks Theatre, located in Norfolk, Virginia
 Crispus Attucks Communication and Writing Magnet School, elementary school located in Kansas City, Missouri
 Crispus Attucks High School, high school located in Indianapolis, Indiana 
 Attucks High School, school in Hopkinsville, Kentucky
 Attucks School, school in Vinita, Oklahoma

Commerce
 Attucks Music Publishing Company (1904–1911), Manhattan, New York